Camp Hill may refer to:

Australia
 Camp Hill, Queensland, a southern suburb of Brisbane
 Camp Hill, a prominent hill in Bendigo with public lookout over the CBD

Canada
 Camp Hill (British Columbia), a cinder cone
 Camp Hill, Halifax, a hill
 Camp Hill Cemetery, a cemetery within Halifax, Nova Scotia, Canada.

United Kingdom
 Camp Hill, Birmingham, an area of Birmingham
 The 1643 Battle of Camp Hill, battle during the First English Civil War
 King Edward VI Camp Hill School for Boys, and King Edward VI Camp Hill School for Girls that were once located there
 Camp Hill railway station, on the Birmingham and Gloucester Railway
Camp Hill Line, a railway in the West Midlands
 HM Prison Camp Hill, a former prison on the Isle of Wight
 Camp Hill, Nuneaton, an area of Nuneaton

United States
 Camp Hill, Alabama, a town 
 Camp Hill, Pennsylvania, a borough 
 Camp Hill (Montgomery County), Pennsylvania, unincorporated community in Pennsylvania
 Camp Hill, Glenn Springs, South Carolina, a historic site
 Camp Hill (West Virginia), a hill
 Camp Hill in Washington, D.C., the location of the US Naval Observatory
 Camp Hill (Massachusetts), a military encampment in 1799–1800

Other
 Camp Hill (Antarctica), small ice-free hill

See also
 Camphill Movement
 Camp Prospect Hill